The Chery Arrizo 3 is a subcompact sedan produced by Chery.

Overview
The Chery Arrizo 3 is essentially a facelifted Chery E3, and was teased by the Chery Arrizo Newbee concept car at the 2014 Guangzhou Auto Show, and debuted by the end of 2014. The power of the Arrizo 3 comes from a 1.5 liter four-cylinder engine producing 122hp, mated to a 5-speed manual transmission or a CVT. The Arrizo 3 was set to replace the Chery Fulwin 2 and placed under the Arrizo 5 compact sedan with the pricing ranging from around 60,000 yuan to 80,000 yuan.

Gallery

References

External links

Arrizo 3
Subcompact cars
Sedans
Cars introduced in 2014
2010s cars